Potassium peroxochromate, potassium tetraperoxochromate(V), or simply potassium perchromate, is an inorganic chemical having the chemical formula K3[Cr(O2)4]. It is a red-brown paramagnetic solid. It is the potassium salt of tetraperoxochromate(V), one of the few examples of chromium in the +5 oxidation state and one of the rare examples of a complex stabilized only by peroxide ligands. This compound is used as a source of singlet oxygen.

Preparation

Potassium peroxochromate is prepared by treating potassium chromate with hydrogen peroxide at 0 ºC:
 2  + 8  → 2  + 8 

The intermediate tetraperoxochromate(VI) is reduced by hydrogen peroxide, forming tetraperoxochromate(V):

 2  + 2  +  → 2  + 2  + 

Thus, the overall reaction is:
2  + 9  + 2  → 2  + 10   + 
The compound decomposes spontaneously at higher temperatures.

References

Potassium compounds
Chromium–oxygen compounds
Oxidizing agents
Peroxides
Chromium(V) compounds